Roger Christopher Thomas FRS (born 2 June 1939) is a British physiologist, former Professor of Physiology, Cambridge University 1996-2006.

References 

 ‘THOMAS, Prof. Roger Christopher’, Who's Who 2011, A & C Black, 2011; online edn, Oxford University Press, Dec 2010 ; online edn, Oct 2010 accessed 11 June 2011

1939 births
Living people
Fellows of the Royal Society
Fellows of Downing College, Cambridge
British physiologists
Professors of Physiology (Cambridge)